Humming Bird is an album by jazz saxophonist Paul Gonsalves that was released in the U.K. in 1970. The album was recorded in England with English jazz musicians Alan Branscombe, Stan Tracey, and David Horler, and Canadian trumpeter Kenny Wheeler.

Track listing
"Humming Bird" 
"Body and Soul"
"What Is There to Stay"
"It's the Talk of the Town"
"All The Things You Are"
"Sticks" 
"X. O. X"
"In a Mellow Tone"
"Almost You"

Personnel 
 Paul Gonsalves – tenor saxophone
 Kenny Wheeler – trumpet
 David Horler – trombone
 Alan Branscombe – piano
 Stan Tracey – piano
 Dave Green – bass guitar
 Kenny Napper – bass guitar
 Benny Goodman – drums

References

1970 albums
Paul Gonsalves albums
Deram Records albums